Phoebe cornuta is a species of beetle in the family Cerambycidae. It was described by Olivier in 1795. It is known from French Guiana and Suriname.

References

Hemilophini
Beetles described in 1795